The Anglican Bishop of Plymouth is an episcopal title used by a suffragan bishop of the Church of England Diocese of Exeter, in the Province of Canterbury, England. The title takes its name after the city of Plymouth in Devon; the See was erected under the Suffragans Nomination Act 1888 by Order in Council dated 21 November 1922. The suffragan bishop has particular episcopal oversight of the archdeaconries of Plymouth and Totnes.

It was announced on 6 July 2022 that James Grier would be the next Bishop of Plymouth. Grier studied Theology at Oxford and later served his curacy at St Andrew's in North Oxford. He was Associate Vicar for St Johns Harborne, Birmingham, then returned to his native Devon as a team vicar and Diocesan Youth Church Advisor and began Unlimited Church with his wife Liz; they have two children.

List of Bishops of Plymouth

References

External links
 Crockford's Clerical Directory - Listings

Anglican bishops of Plymouth
Anglican suffragan bishops in the Diocese of Exeter